AgReserves, Inc. (AgReserves) is a diversified, multinational agriculture for-profit and private company ultimately owned by the Church of Jesus Christ of Latter-day Saints (LDS Church) and based in Salt Lake City, Utah. It is speculated that AgReserves holds the "most valuable private real estate portfolio in the U.S."

AgReserves' three divisions operate in more than 30 states and international operations in Argentina, Brazil, Chile, Mexico, Canada, and the United Kingdom. The three divisions include Ranches (dairy and beef with integrated supply chain trace-ability), Permanent Plantings (farming of almonds, pistachios, walnuts, pecan, olives, citrus), and Row Crops (farming of corn, wheat, alfalfa, carrots, corn, peas, onions, potatoes). As of 2021, Doug Rose is the CEO of AgReserves.

Deseret Ranches, part of the Ranches division of AgReserves, encompasses 295,000-acres and extends across Orange, Osceola and Brevard counties and is seen as critical to the Orlando region's water supply. The ranch is home to about a quarter million citrus trees, timberland, tree farms, commercial crops, and large deposits of fossilized seashells used in road base.

In 2013 AgReserves purchased 382,834 acres from St. Joe Company in Bay, Calhoun, Franklin, Gadsden, Gulf, Jefferson, Leon, Liberty and Wakulla counties. The land, primarily timberland, was purchased for $565 million. As of 2014, the LDS Church was Florida's largest private landowner. AgReserves also owns substantial agricultural land in the United Kingdom. In 2020, AgReserves sold more than 20,000 acres of land surrounding Lake Wimico in Florida to The Nature Conservancy who then donated the land to the state and the Florida Department of Environmental Protection.

Associated Business Units

The AgReserves primary website does not provide information on the operating arms or the regional distinctions of its subsidiary business units. The confusion can be illustrated by an article referencing the Easterday Companies purchase where the Farmland Reserves is depicted as a parent company of AgReserves, and AgriNorthwest is a subsidiary of one of the two. All are referenced as the new potential owner/operators of the Easterday purchase. There are no publicly available lists of farms owned or managed by AgReserves or its subsidiaries. There are also no clear official statements depicting the operating relationships of business or farm units. Some have interpreted this as a purposeful obfuscation of the size (both financial and farm/business units) of the for-profit agricultural arm of the Church of Jesus Christ of Latter-day Saints. 

Businesses Related to AgReserves or other agricultural business units of the Church of Jesus Christ of Latter-day Saints include the following: 

United States

 Farmland Reserve
 Farm Management Co.
 Deseret Ranches (Florida Trees, Fruit, and Cattle)
 Deseret Land and Livestock (Utah)
 AgriNorthwest 

Outside of the United States

 Farmland Reserve UK Ltd
 AgReserves Australia

See also
 Finances of The Church of Jesus Christ of Latter-day Saints

References

External links
 AgReserves website
 Deseret Management Corporation website
 The Church of Jesus Christ of Latter-day Saints website

Economy and Christianity
Companies based in Utah
Deseret Management Corporation
1950 establishments in Utah